Geoffrey "Geoff" W. Wriglesworth (born in September 1943) is an English former professional rugby league footballer who played in the 1960s and 1970s.

Background
Geoff Wriglesworth's birth was registered in York, Yorkshire.

Playing career

County Cup Final appearances
Geoff Wriglesworth played , i.e. number 5, in Leeds' 2-18 defeat by Wakefield Trinity in the 1964 Yorkshire County Cup Final during the 1964–65 season at Fartown Ground, Huddersfield on Saturday 31 October 1964.

International honours
Geoff Wriglesworth won caps for Great Britain while at Leeds in 1965 against New Zealand, and in 1966 against Australia (2 matches), and New Zealand (2 matches).

Club career
Geoff Wriglesworth made his début for Wakefield Trinity against Swinton at Station Road, Swinton on Monday 9 October 1972.

References

External links
!Great Britain Statistics at englandrl.co.uk (statistics currently missing due to not having appeared for both Great Britain, and England)
FLASHBACK: JULY 1966
ON THIS DAY - 5th February 2007
NOSTALGIA: Great Britain shaken to the core by Tamworth defeat
Photograph "Wrigglesworth breaks - Geoff Wrigglesworth breaks through to send Jones in for his try. - 16/09/1967" at www.rlhp.co.uk
Photograph "Colin Dixon gets the ball away - Colin Dixon of Halifax gets the ball away despite the attention of Geoff Wrigglesworth in the Boxing Day game at Odsal. - 26/12/1967" at www.rlhp.co.uk
Photograph "Going down the steps - Northern players go down the steps to take the field against Keighley. - 13/04/1968" at www.rlhp.co.uk

1943 births
Living people
Bradford Bulls players
English rugby league players
Great Britain national rugby league team players
Hull Kingston Rovers players
Leeds Rhinos players
Rugby league centres
Rugby league wingers
Rugby league players from York
Wakefield Trinity players
York Wasps players